Philomena Njeri Mwaura is a Kenyan theologian who is an Associate Professor of Philosophy and Religious Studies at Kenyatta University. She has written in the areas of African theology and mission.

Early life and education
Mwaura has a Bachelor of Education and received a Master of Arts in 1984 with a thesis on the Akurinu churches. She received her PhD from Kenyatta University in 2001 with a thesis titled A theological and cultural analysis of healing in Jerusalem church of Christ and Nabii Christian church of Kenya.

Career
Mwaura was Coordinator of the Theology Commission and Women's Commission (Africa Region) of the Ecumenical Association of Third World Theologians and president of the International Association for Mission Studies. She is a member of the Circle of Concerned African Women Theologians and Chair of the Collaborative Centre for gender and Development in Kenya.

Mwaura teaches in the Center for Gender Equity and Empowerment at Kenyatta University in Nairobi, and was previously its director. She is on the advisory council of the Dictionary of African Christian Biography.

Research
Mwaura's research is in African Christianity, new religious movements and religious education. She was co-editor of Theology in the Context of Globalization: African Women's Response and Challenges and Prospects of the Church in Africa. Mwaura argues that the founding of churches by women in Africa is "the ultimate act of religious independency and self-determination".

Selected publications

Books

Chapters
 t

Journal articles

References

External links
 Interview with Professor Philomena Njeri Mwaura

Living people
Year of birth missing (living people)
Kenyatta University alumni
Academic staff of Kenyatta University
Kenyan women writers
Kenyan Christians
Kenyan theologians
Women Christian theologians
21st-century Protestant theologians
Christian feminist theologians
HIV/AIDS activists